Our Lady of Lourdes Church may refer to:

Asia
 Basilica of Our Lady of Lourdes (Poondi), India
 Our Lady of Lourdes Church, Kanajar, India
 Our Lady of Lourdes Church, Tiruchirappalli, India
 Our Lady of Lourdes Church, Mianyang, China
 National Shrine of Our Lady of Lourdes, Philippines
 Our Lady of Lourdes Parish Church (Bugallon), Philippines
 Our Lady of Lourdes Church, Singapore

Europe
 Sanctuary of Our Lady of Lourdes, the sanctuary in the shrine at Lourdes, France
 Our Lady of Lourdes Church, Hackenthorpe, United Kingdom
 Our Lady of Lourdes Church, Leeds, United Kingdom
 Our Lady of Lourdes, Wanstead, United Kingdom
 Our Lady of Lourdes Church, Istanbul, Turkey
 Our Lady of Lourdes Church, Cross, Ireland
 Sanctuary of the Beata Vergine di Lourdes, Reggio-Emilia, Italy

North America
 Our Lady of Lourdes Roman Catholic Church (Toronto), Canada
 Our Lady of Lourdes Catholic Church (Minneapolis, Minnesota), United States
 Our Lady of Lourdes Church (Manhattan), New York, United States
 Our Lady of Lourdes Church Complex, Providence, Rhode Island, United States
 Our Lady of Lourdes Church (Victoria, Texas), United States

South America
 Iglesia de Cristo Obrero y Nuestra Señora de Lourdes, Estación Atlántida, Uruguay
 Iglesia de Nuestra Señora de Lourdes, Montevideo, Uruguay
 Iglesia de Nuestra Señora de Lourdes y San Vicente Pallotti, Montevideo, Uruguay

See also
 Our Lady of Lourdes School (disambiguation)
 Cathedral of Our Lady of Lourdes (disambiguation)
 Grotto of Our Lady of Lourdes, Notre Dame, Indiana, USA
 Our Lady of Lourdes, Marian veneration